Franz Wittmann may refer to:

Franz Wittmann (physicist) (1860–1932), Hungarian electrician and physicist
Franz Wittmann, Sr. (born 1950), Austrian rally driver
Franz Wittmann, Jr. (born 1983), Austrian rally driver, son of Franz Wittmann, Sr.

See also
 Frank Wittmann (born 1970), German footballer
 Wittmann